New York's 18th State Assembly district is one of the 150 districts in the New York State Assembly. It has been represented by Democrat Taylor Darling since 2019, after defeating then 30-year Assemblymember Earlene Hooper in the 2018 Democratic primary.

Geography
District 18 is in Nassau County. It contains parts of the town of Hempstead, including the village of Hempstead, Roosevelt, Freeport, Lakeview, and Uniondale.

Recent election results

2022

2020

2018

2016

2014

2012

2010

References

18
Nassau County, New York